Heinrich Rauß (born 2 August 1890, date of death unknown) was an Austrian wrestler. He competed in the featherweight event at the 1912 Summer Olympics.

References

External links
 

1890 births
Year of death missing
Olympic wrestlers of Austria
Wrestlers at the 1912 Summer Olympics
Austrian male sport wrestlers
People from the Condominium of Bosnia and Herzegovina